Professor Eldred Durosimi Jones (6 January 1925 – 21 March 2020) was a Sierra Leonean academic and literary critic, known for his book Othello's Countrymen: A Study of Africa in the Elizabethan and Jacobean Drama. He was a principal of Fourah Bay College. Jones died in Freetown, Sierra Leone, around 1am on Saturday, 21 March 2020.

Biography 
Eldred Durosimi Jones was born on 6 January 1925 to Sierra Leone Creole parents. On his maternal side, Jones descended from the Jamaican Maroons. Jones attended the CMS Grammar School, Freetown, and Fourah Bay College (1944–47), completing a Bachelor of Arts degree. He studied in England at Corpus Christi College, Oxford (1950–53) and the main campus of the University of Durham (1962).

In 1968, he became the first editor of the journal African Literature Today, continuing in the role for more than three decades. 

His critical works include Othello's Countrymen: A Study of the African in Elizabethan and Jacobean Drama (Oxford University Press, 1985), The Writing of Wole Soyinka (Heinemann, 1973), and The Elizabethan Image of Africa (University of Virginia for the Folger Shakespeare Library, 1971).  Jones was also the author of The Freetown Bond: A Life under Two Flags (James Currey, 2012) with the help of his wife Marjorie Jones.

Eldred Jones died on 21 March 2020, at the age of 95.

References

External links
Review of The Freetown Bond: A Life under Two Flags by Jane Plastow, Leeds African Studies Bulletin, 75 (2013/14), 30 July 2013. 
 Kole Omotoso, "Eldred Durosimi (Pause For Breath) Jones 1925 – 2020", The Guardian (Nigeria), 19 April 2020.

1925 births
2020 deaths
Academic staff of Fourah Bay College
Alumni of Corpus Christi College, Oxford
Fourah Bay College alumni
Linguists from Sierra Leone
People educated at the Sierra Leone Grammar School
Sierra Leone Creole people
Sierra Leonean writers
Sierra Leoneans of Jamaican Maroon descent
Scholars of African literature
Linguists from Jamaica